The basic law on copyright in Venezuela is the Law on Copyright 1993 as supplemented by various other laws and conventions, specifically the Regulations under the Law on Copyright (approved by Decree No. 618 of April 11, 1995). Venezuela has signed the Berne Convention.

References

External links
Law No.1322 of April 13, 1992 on Copyright Full text of the law in English.
Law No.1322 of April 13, 1992 on Copyright Full text of the law in French.
Law No.1322 of April 13, 1992 on Copyright Full text of the law in Spanish.

Law of Venezuela
Venezuela